= Baba Aya Singh College =

College in Gurdaspur, Punjab, India

Baba Aaya Singh Riarki College is a private college in Gurdaspur, Punjab, India.

The original idea for the institution was conceived in 1923 by religious reformer Baba Aaya Singh. Using funds from other countries, the main school building was constructed, but was never opened after Baba Aaya Singh's death in 1957.

Construction of the current college was started by Com. S. Chanan Singh, with the vision that there would be a free girls' college in the area. Until Singhh's death, the institution remained a free education college. Despite funding issues that delayed initial construction and opening, the institution opened on Women's Day in 1976 and the first class of students consisted of 14 girls.

Com. S. Chanan Singh appointed Swaran Singh Virk as principal of this new institute, who was a teacher originally and later brought in his wife to be the warden of the college hostel when the girls' hostel was started.

== Student body ==
In 1999, there were total 4500 students, 496 of which were in-hostel. The teachers volunteer to educate the students, and senior students mentor underclassmen.
